Jennifer Ann McAllister (born July 9, 1996), also known as jennxpenn, is an American internet personality, actress, and clothing designer. McAllister is best known for her work on YouTube, where she has amassed over 3.5 million subscribers, and was nominated for a Shorty Award and four Teen Choice Awards.

In 2015, McAllister made her acting debut with the GRB Studio film Bad Night. She went on to lead the YouTube Red series Foursome from 2016 to 2018, and starred in the Hulu original series All Night. For the former, McAllister won the Streamy Award for Best Actress.

Early life 
McAllister was born on July 9, 1996 in Bucks County, Pennsylvania, where she attended Council Rock High School South in Holland, Pennsylvania, about 25 miles north of Philadelphia.

Career

McAllister created her YouTube channel jennxpenn at the age of 12 on January 15, 2009, but already had prior YouTube experience through a channel created beforehand with a friend.  The channel has since amassed over 3.5 million subscribers, and her internet work has earned her nominations for a Shorty Award and four Teen Choice Awards.

In March 2013, McAllister signed a YouTube partnership deal with AwesomenessTV; she appeared primarily in skits and segments on their YouTube channel. She also starred in the pilot episode of AwesomenessTV's sketch comedy series of the same name, which premiered on Nickelodeon on July 1, 2013.

On April 20, 2014, she went on 16-city North American tour in celebration of reaching 1 million subscribers on YouTube with fellow YouTuber Tyler Ward, which took place at the beginning of May and the entirety of June. In June 2014, McAllister signed a YouTube management deal with Fullscreen.

At the 2015 Playlist Live convention, it was announced that McAllister and fellow YouTuber Lauren Elizabeth Luthringshausen would be starring in a film titled Bad Night. The film was produced by GRB Entertainment, and was released through Vimeo on Demand in July of that same year. Also in 2015, McAllister made her writing debut with the autobiography Really Professional Internet Person, which was released in August 2015 and became a New York Times Best Seller.

In February 2016, it was announced that McAllister would portray the leading role of Addie Fixler in the YouTube Red original series Foursome. In an interview with TheWrap, she described her relationships with the series' cast, stating that "I grew really close to everyone. It was kind of like a summer camp … I was on set for 12 and a half hours every day, so you’re really close with these people." The series was released in March of that same year, and ran for four seasons until 2018. For her performance, she won the Streamy Award for Best Actress at the 6th Annual Streamy Awards.

In 2018, McAllister was cast in the role of Deanna Hoffman in the Hulu series All Night; the series premiered on May 11, 2018 and ended after one season. In the year following, she competed in the first season of the reality-style web show The Reality House, a series inspired by Big Brother where several YouTubers compete for $25,000.

Personal life 
In July 2013, McAllister moved from her home in Pennsylvania to Los Angeles, California. In September 2014, McAllister partnered with the nonprofit organization Our Time, releasing a video telling her viewers aged eighteen or above to register themselves to vote in the United States.

In November 2020, in a video titled "addressing your assumptions about me...", McAllister came out as bisexual.

Filmography

Film

Television

Awards and nominations

Books

References

External links 
 

1996 births
21st-century American actresses
21st-century American writers
Actresses from Pennsylvania
American YouTubers
Bisexual actresses
Living people
People from Bucks County, Pennsylvania
Streamy Award winners
LGBT YouTubers
American bisexual actors